This is a survey of the postage stamps and postal history of South Georgia and the South Sandwich Islands.

First stamps
The first stamps specifically for South Georgia were issued in 1944 and consisted of overprints on stamps of the Falkland Islands for use in South Georgia when it was part of the Falkland Islands Dependencies.

1946 to 1963
From 1946 to 1963, South Georgia used stamps of the Falkland Islands Dependencies.

1963 to 1979
In 1963, the British Antarctic Territory was formed, leaving only the island groups of South Georgia and the South Sandwich Islands in the Falkland Islands Dependencies. From 1963 to 1979, South Georgia had its own stamps simply marked South Georgia.

1980 to 1985
From 1980 to 1985, South Georgia again used stamps of the Falkland Islands Dependencies.

Present

From 1986, stamps of the territory are inscribed South Georgia & South Sandwich Islands.

See also
Postage stamps and postal history of the Falkland Islands
Postage stamps and postal history of the Falkland Islands Dependencies

References

Further reading
Grant, B.S.H. The Postage Stamps of the Falkland Islands and Dependencies. London: Stanley Gibbons, 1952.

External links
The Falkland Islands Philatelic Study Group.
Stamps - South Georgia & South Sandwich Islands official website.

Philately of the Falkland Islands
History of South Georgia and the South Sandwich Islands